Park Min-Keun  (born 27 February 1984) is a South Korean footballer who plays as a midfielder for Changwon City.

External links 

1984 births
Living people
Association football midfielders
Hannam University alumni
South Korean footballers
Jeju United FC players
Changwon City FC players
Daejeon Hana Citizen FC players
Korea National League players
K League 1 players